Jane Wilson and Louise Wilson  (born 1967 in Newcastle upon Tyne) are British artists who work together as a sibling duo. Jane and Louise Wilson's art work is based in video, film and photography. They are YBA artists who were nominated for the Turner Prize in 1999.

Lives and careers

The collaboration begins
Louise studied for a BA at Duncan of Jordanstone College of Art, Dundee, and Jane at Newcastle Polytechnic (1989). For their degree show they submitted identical work (photographs where they appeared to be murdering each other, one by drowning, one with a noose).

Jane and Louise Wilson then studied together on the MA course at Goldsmiths College, London (1990-1992). When they left art school, they lived in King's Cross and made films of small living spaces, such as bed and breakfast rooms. Another early film showed them taking LSD for the first time.

Jane and Louise Wilson's work together includes multiscreen video installations and photo-pieces; their artworks often feature institutional spaces, for example an oil rig, the archives of the Stasi in East Berlin (the building had previously been used by the Nazis and Stalin's Russia), The Houses of Parliament, and the Apollo Pavilion in Peterlee designed by Victor Pasmore.

Turner Prize 1999
The pair were nominated for the Turner Prize in 1999, cited for their exhibition, Gamma at the Lisson Gallery in London. On the run up to the Turner Prize winner announcement, they also had a solo exhibition at the Serpentine Gallery in London (1999). Art works that were exhibited included Stasi City, Parliament (A Third House), and Gamma, a multiscreen video installation that was filmed at the former US military base at Greenham Common in Berkshire. This site was used to house nuclear cruise missiles during the Cold War and decommissioned in 1992. The Wilsons' video moves through the deserted institution, where nothing is now happening, evoking disturbing memories and possibilities. There is a sense of unease and threat, implied but never realised. They are the only characters in the film, appearing in military-style skirts and polished black shoes.

2000s
In 2003, the Wilsons developed their work with greater complexity, involving not only multiple projections but also a variety of differently positioned surfaces as screens in the art work and exhibition A Free and Anonymous Monument (2003). It includes films of a microchip factory, playing children, a lake, a rusting oil rig and the Apollo Pavilion in Peterlee New Town, near Gateshead. In 2009 they created 'Unfolding the Aryan Papers', based on the extensive research they conducted at the Stanley Kubrick Archive, University of the Arts, London. A commission by Animate Projects and the British Film Institute through the contemporary arts programme of the BFI Gallery, where the resulting installation was presented

In 2013-14, Jane and Louise Wilson had a solo exhibition at Whitworth Art Gallery in Manchester, England which addressed the aftermath of atrocities. Their works Blind Landings (H-bomb Test Site, Orford Ness) #1-6 are in the collection and on display at Tate Britain.

In 2018 Jane and Louise Wilson were elected to be Royal Academician.

References

External links
janeandlouisewilson.co.uk (official site)
303 Gallery, New York: Jane & Louise Wilson (303 Gallery)
Interview with Jane & Louise Wilson
Audio interview with Jane & Louise Wilson about their images of Atlantic Wall Bunkers

1967 births
Living people
Alumni of Goldsmiths, University of London
Alumni of the University of Dundee
Art duos
Artists from Newcastle upon Tyne
English women artists
English installation artists
English contemporary artists
Sibling artists
English twins
20th-century English women
20th-century English people
21st-century English women
21st-century English people
Royal Academicians